Arthur Woodbury Sager (July 4, 1904 – January 17, 2000) was an American track and field athlete who competed in the 1928 Summer Olympics.

He was born in Gardiner, Maine and died in Boxford, Massachusetts. He worked at The Governor Dummer Academy and wrote a book called Speak Your Way to Success.

He is the maternal grandfather of actor Seth MacFarlane.

In 1928 he finished tenth in the javelin throw competition.

References

1904 births
2000 deaths
People from Gardiner, Maine
Track and field athletes from Maine
American male javelin throwers
Olympic track and field athletes of the United States
Athletes (track and field) at the 1928 Summer Olympics